Westmob, a gang in San Francisco, California, has fought a brutal gang war since 1999 against Big Block and its various factions. Westmob is sometimes known to associate with Oakdale Mob and Sunnydale gangsters. Its rivalry with Big Block was the subject of the 2002 documentary Straight Outta Hunter's Point and is linked to rap and drugs. They claim territory from West Point to Middle Point in San Francisco's notoriously dangerous Hunters Point projects.

The gang made headlines around the nation when one of its members, David Hill, was arrested for murdering a police officer in April 2004.

References

External links
 KRON 4 news- Many SF Homicides Linked to Gang Wars- Map of SF gang areas

African-American gangs
Street gangs
Gangs in San Francisco